The Battle of La Rochelle was a naval battle fought on 22 and 23 June 1372 between a Castilian fleet commanded by the Castilian  Ambrosio Boccanegra and an English fleet commanded by John Hastings, 2nd Earl of Pembroke. The Castilian fleet had been sent to attack the English at La Rochelle, which was being besieged by the French. Besides Boccanegra, other Castilian commanders were Cabeza de Vaca, Fernando de Peón and Ruy Díaz de Rojas.

Pembroke had been dispatched to the town with a small retinue of 160 soldiers, £12,000 and instructions to use the money to recruit an army of 3,000 soldiers around Aquitaine for at least four months. The strength of the fleet is estimated as between the 12 galleys given by the Castilian chronicler and naval captain López de Ayala and the 40 sailing ships, of which three ships were warships and 13 barges mentioned by the French chronicler Jean Froissart. The English fleet probably consisted of 32 ships and 17 small barges of about 50 tons.

The Castilian victory was complete and the entire English fleet was captured or destroyed. On his return to the Iberian Peninsula, Boccanegra seized another four English ships off Bordeaux. This defeat undermined English seaborne trade and supplies through the English Channel and threatened their Gascon possessions.

Background

In 1372 the English monarch Edward III planned an important campaign in Aquitaine under the new lieutenant of the Duchy, the Earl of Pembroke. He contracted to serve a year in the duchy with a retinue of 24 knights, 55 squires and 80 archers besides other companies led by Sir Hugh Calveley and Sir John Devereux, who finally did not serve or did not appear. Pembroke was given £12,000 with instructions to use the money to recruit a host of 500 knights, 1,500 esquires and 1,500 archers in France for at least four months. One of Edward's clerks, John Wilton, was appointed to accompany the Earl and administer the funds.

The Earl of Pembroke, his retinue and Wilton embarked at Plymouth aboard a transport fleet which was unprepared for serious engagement. The Castilian chronicler Pero López de Ayala estimated that this fleet had 36 ships, whereas the chronicler of the French court estimated it to be 35. Jean Froissart, in one of his two descriptions of the battle, put the English force on 'perhaps' 14 ships. A fleet of 20 vessels is considered a creditable force. Sir Philip Courtenay, Admiral of the West, provided escort with 3 larger fighting ships (large tonnage and archer towers).

The English rule in Aquitaine was by then under threat. Since 1370 large parts of the region had fallen under French rule. In 1372, Bertrand du Guesclin lay siege at La Rochelle. To respond to the demands of the Franco-Castilian alliance of 1368, the king of Castile, Henry II of Trastámara, dispatched a fleet to Aquitaine under Ambrosio Boccanegra, assisted by Cabeza de Vaca, Fernando de Peón and Rui Díaz de Rojas. The size of this fleet is also uncertain. According to López de Ayala, it was composed of 12 galleys. Froissart, in his first account, mentioned 40 sailing ships and 13 barges, but later reduced this number to 13 galleys. Quatre Premiers Valois and Chronique des Pays-Bas mention respectively 20 and 22 galleys.

Battle

On 21 June the English fleet arrived at La Rochelle and the battle began as Pembroke's ships approached the harbour. This lay at the head of an inlet which was partially unnavigable at low water. The first Castilian attacks met strong resistance. The English, despite the inferiority of their numbers, defended themselves vigorously. At dusk, when the tide rose, the two fleets separated. Though they had lost two or four vessels, according to Froissart, the English were not yet defeated. Pembroke then withdrew some way from land, while Boccanegra anchored in front of La Rochelle. The Chronicle Quatre Premiers Valois, unlike López de Ayala and Froissart, implies that only some skirmishes took place on the first day, as Boccanegra would have ordered his galleys to withdraw, reserving them for the main action. According to this chronicle, the anchoring sites were reversed: the English off the town and the Castilians on the open sea.

Froissart described a discussion between Pembroke and his men during the night of 21–22 June regarding how to escape the trap. An attempt to escape under the cover of the night was dismissed due to the fear of the Castilian galleys, as well as another to enter La Rochelle because of the low draft of the passage. In the end, the low tide left the English ships aground. Castilian galleys could maneuver freely in shallow water. That gave them a decisive tactical advantage. An additional handicap for the English was the taller air draught of the Castilian ships, which enabled their crews to built wooden breastworks and throw arrows and bolts from a higher position. The Castilian vessels were equipped with arbalests that loosed quarrels on the wooden decks of the English ships. When the fight resumed on the morning of the 22nd, the Castilians managed to set fire to some of them by spraying oil on their decks and rigging and then igniting it with flaming arrows. Many of the English were killed or burned alive, while other surrendered, among them Pembroke. The Spanish naval historian Cesáreo Fernández Duro claims that the English prisoners amounted to 400 knights and 8,000 soldiers, without counting the slain. Estimates in English chronicles speak of about 1,500 casualties, 800 deaths and between 160 and 400 prisoners. The whole fleet was destroyed or captured and £12,000 fell into Castilian hands. The English defeat appeared inevitable from the beginning because of the major inequality in strength.

Aftermath 
The battle of La Rochelle was the first important English naval defeat of the Hundred Years' War; furthermore, It was described by historian J. H. Ramsay as the worst  defeat ever inflicted on the English navy, Its effect upon the course of the war was significant: La Rochelle was lost on 7 September. Its capture was followed during the second half of the year by nearly all of Poitou, Angoumois and Saintonge, which Bertrand du Guesclin cleared of English garrisons. Some authors claim that the battle cost England its naval supremacy along the French coast but others disagree, though asserting that England's naval policy had become misguided. The projected resources to support John of Gaunt's claims to the Castilian throne were largely suspended, while a great expedition under Edward III himself had to be postponed because of contrary winds.

The English needed a year to rebuild their fleet through the efforts of fourteen towns. In April 1373 a powerful force under William de Montacute, Earl of Salisbury, set sail for Portugal. It was commanded by Admirals Neville and Courtenay in two divisions, the first consisting of 15 ships and 9 barges and the second, 12 ships and 9 barges, 44 fighting vessels all told. Other ships and barges joined the large concentration and by July, Salisbury had 56 ships crewed by 2,500 sailors and an army of 2,600 soldiers. This campaign of 1373 was successful, seeing, amongst other events, the burning of a Castilian merchant convoy at Saint-Malo. In retaliation, Fernando Sanchez de Tovar, who had succeeded Boccanegra as Major Admiral of Castile after his death in 1374, joined forces with the French admiral Jean de Vienne against England. Naval supremacy in the English channel, won in the battle of La Rochelle, allowed the allied fleet to plunder and burn the Isle of Wight and the English ports of Rye, Rottingdean, Winchelsea, Lewes, Folkestone, Plymouth, Portsmouth and Hastings between 1374 and 1380. Local levy troops raised by the Earl of Arundel were defeated in a land battle at Lewes. In 1380 the joint fleet sailed up the Thames and burned Gravesend, over 20 miles east of London.

See also
 Fernando Sánchez de Tovar
 Battle of La Rochelle (1419)

References

Bibliography

External links
 Battle of La Rochelle (1372) and its consequences.

La Rochelle
Naval battles involving Castile
Naval battles involving England
Naval battles of the Middle Ages
Conflicts in 1372
1372 in England
1370s in France
14th century in Castile
14th century in England
14th century in France
La Rochelle
Hundred Years' War, 1369–1389